Roberto Martínez Celigueta (born 21 February 1966) is a former Spanish footballer.

He is the brother of Daniel Martínez Celigueta, also a footballer.

External links
Lfp.es

Spanish footballers
Footballers from the Basque Country (autonomous community)
Athletic Bilbao footballers
Real Valladolid players
Granada CF footballers
La Liga players
Association football forwards
Footballers from Pamplona
1966 births
Living people
Spain youth international footballers
Bilbao Athletic footballers
UD Salamanca players
Palamós CF footballers
UD Almería players
Mérida UD footballers